Allameh Helli Schools, named after Al-Hilli, are schools found in various cities of Iran. Students study subjects in depth, similar to college courses. Allameh Helli Schools are for boys only, while Farzanegan schools are the equivalent for girls.

History of Allameh Helli Schools

The schools were named after Al-Hilli, an 8th-century Shi'ite scholar born in Hilla, Iraq. He was proficient in Ijtihad.

History

The school was founded in 1976 as the National Iranian Organization for Gifted and Talented Education(NODET).

See also
Gifted education
Shahid Soltani School - Equivalent NODET center in Karaj, Iran.

References

External links
 Official website of Tehran's Allameh Helli School
 Official website of Tehran's Allameh Helli 2 High School
 Official website of Tehran's Allameh Helli 3 High School
 Official website of Tehran's Allameh Helli 4 High School

Boys' schools in Iran
Schools in Tehran
Gifted education